The Buckman and Ulmer Building was a historic building in Jacksonville, Florida. It was built in 1925 by Jacksonville architects Marsh & Saxelbye for the Buckman and Ulmer Real Estate Company. It was located at 29-33 West Monroe Street. On December 30, 1992, it was added to the U.S. National Register of Historic Places. It was later demolished to construct the current Jacksonville Main Library.

References

External links
 Duval County listings at National Register of Historic Places
 Florida's Office of Cultural and Historical Programs
 Duval County listings
 Buckman and Ulmer Building

Buildings and structures in Jacksonville, Florida
History of Jacksonville, Florida
National Register of Historic Places in Jacksonville, Florida
Buildings and structures completed in 1925
1925 establishments in Florida